War in Yugoslavia may refer to:

 World War II in Yugoslavia, mainly a guerrilla liberation war and partially a civil war taking place during World War II (1941–1945) in Axis-occupied Yugoslavia
 Yugoslav Wars, ethnic conflicts fought from 1991 to 1999 during and after the breakup of Yugoslavia